William FitzGilbert was the fifteenth Lord Chancellor of England, from 1141 to 1142, serving the Empress Matilda.

Notes

References
Powicke, F. Maurice and E. B. Fryde Handbook of British Chronology 2nd. ed. London:Royal Historical Society 1961

See also
List of Lord Chancellors and Lord Keepers

Lord chancellors of England
12th-century English people